Michael del Marco Lupo (19 January 1953 – 12 February 1995) was a serial killer originally from Italy, who was active in the UK. He operated from the Yves Saint Laurent boutique in Brompton Road, London during the 1980s.

History 
On 15 March 1986, the body of a 37-year-old murder victim named James Burns, a railway worker originally from Edinburgh, was found in a derelict flat in Kensington, London. The investigation made little progress because there was no obvious link between a perpetrator and the dead man.

On 6 April that year, the corpse of Anthony Connolly, 24, was found on a railway embankment in Brixton. He had been strangled with his own scarf. Because Connolly had been sharing a flat with a man who was HIV positive, there was a long delay between the discovery of the body and the post mortem because the coroner wanted to make sure Connolly was not himself infected with HIV. This created serious tensions between the authorities and the gay community, the latter accusing the former of dragging their heels and not taking the death of a gay man seriously enough.

Trial and imprisonment 
Six weeks later, on 18 May, Michele del Marco Lupo was arrested and charged with the murders of Connolly and Burns. Lupo, who ran a flower shop in Chelsea, was originally from Italy and a former soldier. He apparently called himself "The Wolf Man" ("lupo" means "wolf" in Italian) and boasted of having had 4,000 lovers.

On 21 May, Lupo was charged with two other recent killings, those of a young hospital worker named Damien McCloskey, who had been strangled in West London, and an unidentified man, who was murdered near Hungerford Bridge over the Thames. In addition to these four murders, Lupo was charged with two attempted murders.

In July 1987, at the Old Bailey, Lupo was sentenced to four life sentences, plus 14 years. Lupo had pleaded guilty to all charges. There were investigations in cities Lupo had visited in the early 1980s, such as New York City, Berlin and Los Angeles, to see if he was responsible for unsolved homicides in those locations, although no evidence of any further crimes committed by Lupo came to light.

In February 1995, Lupo died in Frankland Prison, County Durham from an AIDS related illness. He had contracted the disease shortly before murdering his first victim and told the police that discovering his medical condition had led to a loathing of fellow homosexuals with him developing a "callous rationale" and an "urge to kill". He spent the last years of his life in a prison hospital.

See also
 List of serial killers in the United Kingdom

References

External links
 The New Encyclopedia Of Serial Killers, Brian Lane and Wilfred Gregg (Revised Edition 1996), Headline Book Publishing 
 The Independent obituary

1953 births
1995 deaths
20th-century Italian LGBT people
AIDS-related deaths in England
Italian emigrants to the United Kingdom
Italian people convicted of murder
Italian people imprisoned abroad
Italian people who died in prison custody
Italian prisoners sentenced to life imprisonment
Italian serial killers
Italian LGBT people
Male serial killers
Murder in London
People convicted of murder by England and Wales
People from the Province of Potenza
Prisoners sentenced to life imprisonment by England and Wales
Prisoners who died in England and Wales detention
Serial killers who died in prison custody
Violence against gay men
Violence against men in the United Kingdom